Olamide Brown, née Orekunrin (born 1986), is a British-Nigerian medical doctor, healthcare entrepreneur and founder of the Flying Doctors Healthcare Investment Group and a director of Greentree Investment Company.

Flying Doctors Healthcare Group is active in air ambulance services, consulting/healthcare technology, hospital/clinic construction, diagnostics and equipment, health facility management and  pharmaceutical retail.

Early life and education
Brown was born in London, England. She attended Hull York Medical School. After graduation, she worked in acute medicine in the UK and then went on to be awarded a Japanese MEXT scholarship, which allowed her to further her studies in Tokyo, through the fellowship focused on lab-based research with induced pluripotent stem cells. She is studying for a master's degree in finance and economic policy at the University of London, and also has a certificate in economic policymaking from IE business school, Spain. In addition, she has a certificate in accounting for decision making from the University of Michigan in the US.

Medical career
After graduation, Brown worked for a short period of time in the UK's National Health Service. With her training in aviation medicine, she was the boss and CEO of West Africa's first air-operated emergency medical services in Lagos, Nigeria; Flying Doctors Nigeria Ltd.

She is a member of the American College of Emergency Physicians and was listed among the 2013 Young Global leaders by the World Economic Forum.

Flying Doctors 
Brown started the Flying Doctors after experiencing the loss of her sister under difficult circumstances, and to improve medical services in Nigeria, established Flying Doctors in Lagos, Nigeria in 2007.

In 2018, a negligence case was instituted against Flying Doctors and Brown by the family of a late patient Nabil Hanga, This suit was later withdrawn by the family. Flying Doctors maintains that Brown works in the area of strategy, marketing and investment.

Investment and finance 
Alongside her work at Flying Doctors, Brown, Olabode Agusto and Abasiama Idaresit run an early-stage venture capital firm: Greentree Investment Company which provides capital to African technology start-ups. Investments include :Paystack, Precurio,Big Cabal Mediain and a portfolio of $80m.

In 2019, she founded The Flying Doctors Healthcare Investment Company which operates air ambulance services & logistics. It is involved in consulting/healthcare technology, hospital/clinic constructions, diagnostics and equipments, health facility management and pharmaceutical retail. It is involved with Koniku, a biotechnology firm & a drug manufacturing company; a chain of pharmacies, a diagnostic company, and a full-scale logistics firm that moves goods including pharmaceuticals across West Africa and Helium Health.

At the height of the COVID-19 pandemic in Nigeria, Brown and her FDHIC team launched a COVID-19 mobile testing booth, which reduces the need for PPE by providing a barrier between the potentially infected patient.

In July 2020, Brown hosted Nigeria's Minister of Industry, Trade and Investment, Otunba Adebayo in the first edition of ‘ The Conversation’ with the Flying Doctors Healthcare Investment Company, with discussions centered around investment growth and opportunities in the healthcare sector.

Appearances and publications 
She has spoken at various platforms around the world, including the World Economic Forum, TED Global Conference, the Social Media Week Lagos, the European Union, the Swiss Economic Forum, the UN, the World Bank, the World Economic Forum, the Massachusetts Institute of Technology, Cambridge University and the Aspen Ideas Festival.

Brown and her work have been featured on various media platforms. She is also an editor of the International Journal of Emergency Services and has published three books – EMQ's in Paediatrics, Pre-Hospital Care for Africa and Fixing Healthcare in Nigeria; a Guide to Public Healthcare Policy. She has written articles in the British Medical Journal:the Journal of Emergency Medical Services, the Niger Delta Medical Journal, The New York Times and The Huffington Post.

Honors 
Awards and recognition include:
World Economic Forum (WEF) Young Global Leader.
Forbes 20 Young Power Women In Africa 2013 
Forbes Africa's 30 Under 30 for 2015 
YWomen – YNaija 100 Most Influential Women in Nigeria 2015  
Silverbird Group Extraordinary Business Achievement Award, 2018 in Lagos, the youngest person ever to win this award. 
YNaija Business Power List 2020
She was conferred with a National honor - Member of the Order of the Federal Republic (MFR) by President Muhammadu Buhari.
African Folder Female Founders You Should Know In 2023.

References

External links
 Dr Ola Brown Website
 Flying Doctors Website

People from Lowestoft
Medical doctors from London
British women medical doctors
Nigerian women medical doctors
Alumni of the University of Hull
Living people
21st-century English medical doctors
Helicopter pilots
British women company founders
Nigerian women company founders
21st-century Nigerian medical doctors
Nigerian nonprofit businesspeople
Nigerian health care businesspeople
21st-century Nigerian businesswomen
21st-century Nigerian businesspeople
21st-century women physicians
Nigerian corporate directors
Nigerian venture capitalists
Women corporate directors
1986 births